Blindfolded is a 1918 American silent crime drama film directed by Raymond B. West and starring Bessie Barriscale.

Plot

Cast

Preservation
With no prints of Blindfolded located in any film archives, it is a lost film.

References

External links

 
 

1918 films
American silent feature films
American black-and-white films
Lost American films
American crime drama films
1918 crime drama films
1918 lost films
Films distributed by W. W. Hodkinson Corporation
Lost drama films
Films directed by Raymond B. West
1910s American films
Silent American drama films
Films with screenplays by Richard Schayer